Cauca contestata is a species of beetle in the family Cerambycidae, and the only species in the genus Cauca. It was described by Lane in 1970.

References

Apomecynini
Beetles described in 1970